The Minister for Europe and International Development is a junior ministerial post in the Scottish Government. As a result, the minister does not attend the Scottish Cabinet. The minister supports the Cabinet Secretary for the Constitution, Europe and External Affairs, who is a full member of the cabinet.

The post was created in September 2012. The role was modified in February 2020 with migration moving to another post.

Overview 
The specific responsibilities of the minister are:
International development
Post-Brexit Relations
Cross government co-ordination on the European Union 
Fair trade
Scottish diaspora

History
In September 2012 the position of Minister for External Affairs and International Development was created; the name of the role changed a November 2014 reshuffle when Nicola Sturgeon became First Minister. It was changed again in May 2016, after the 2016 election, and again in June 2018.

List of office holders
The current Minister for Europe, Migration and International Development is Neil Gray.

References

External links 
Cabinet and Ministers on Scottish Government website
Minister for Europe and International Development on Scottish Government website

Scottish Parliament
External Affairs and International Development